The Dub is a lost 1919 American silent comedy film directed by James Cruze and written by Edgar Franklin and Will M. Ritchey. The film stars Wallace Reid, Charles Ogle, Ralph Lewis, Raymond Hatton, Winter Hall, and Nina Byron. The film was released on January 19, 1919, by Paramount Pictures.

Plot
When the brokerage firm of Blatch, Markham and Driggs dissolves, Markham steals company records and the option of a valuable mine. Meanwhile, Blatch, who wants the option to expire, so he can then purchase it at a low price, hires attorney Burley Hadden to convince Driggs that he is trying to recover it. Hadden sees John Craig, a bungling construction contractor who needs $800 for his payroll, running nervously from the pop of a paper bag, and offers the supposed "dub" $1,000 to retrieve the papers, thinking he will fail. After Markham tries to dupe John, he meets Enid Drayton, Markham's ward, who is being held a virtual prisoner in Markham's mansion. With the help of a friendly burglar, they retrieve the option and other papers which prove that Markham and Blatch had been cheating Driggs for years. After Driggs rewards John and informs Enid that she owns a million dollar estate, she and John embrace.

Cast
Wallace Reid as John Craig 
Charles Ogle as George Markham
Ralph Lewis as Frederick Blatch
Raymond Hatton as Phineas Driggs
Winter Hall as Burley Hadden
Nina Byron as Enid Drayton
Guy Oliver as Robbins
Harry O'Connor as James
William Elmer as Burglar Bill 
Clarence Geldart as Craig's Clerk

See also
Wallace Reid filmography

References

External links

Lantern slide (Wayback Machine)

1919 films
1910s English-language films
Silent American comedy films
1919 comedy films
Lost American films
Paramount Pictures films
Films directed by James Cruze
American black-and-white films
American silent feature films
1919 lost films
Lost comedy films
1910s American films